Full Circle is the second studio album by American hip hop collective Hieroglyphics.  It was released by Hieroglyphics Imperium Recordings on October 7, 2003. It peaked at number 155 on the Billboard 200 chart.

Critical reception
John Bush of AllMusic gave the album 4 stars out of 5, calling it "the best record of their career."

Track listing

Personnel
Credits adapted from liner notes.

 Domino – production (1, 3, 4, 5, 6, 12, 16)
 Amp Fiddler – keyboards (1, 2, 3, 8, 10), background vocals (3, 8), vibraphone (4), piano (9, 12), bassline (9)
 Opio – keyboards (2, 8, 9), production (2, 8, 9, 10)
 Toure – turntables (2)
 Merlo Podlewski – bass guitar (4, 5, 6)
 Casual – bells (5), production (11)
 A-Plus – production (7, 13, 15), turntables (15)
 Eric McFaddin – guitar (9)
 Space Boy Boogie – production (14)
 Frank Friction – co-production (14)
 Matt Kelley – engineering, editing
 Ken Lee – mastering
 James Sheehan – design
 Block – photography

Charts

References

External links
 

2003 albums
Hieroglyphics (group) albums
Hieroglyphics Imperium Recordings albums